Love Finds a Way is a 1909 American silent short drama film directed by D. W. Griffith.

Cast
 Anita Hendrie as The Duchess
 Arthur V. Johnson as The Duke
 Marion Leonard as Their Daughter
 Harry Solter as One of the Daughter's Suitors
 Charles Inslee as One of the Daughter's Suitors
 Linda Arvidson as Lady-in-Waiting
 Charles Avery as Plotter
 John R. Cumpson as Footman
 George Gebhardt as Plotter
 David Miles as Minister
 Mack Sennett as Footman
 Charles West
 Dorothy West as Lady-in-Waiting

References

External links
 

1909 films
1909 drama films
Silent American drama films
American silent short films
American black-and-white films
Films directed by D. W. Griffith
1909 short films
1900s American films